The 1980 United States presidential election in Nebraska took place on November 4, 1980. All 50 states and The District of Columbia were part of the 1980 United States presidential election. Voters chose five electors to the Electoral College, who voted for president and vice president.

Nebraska was won by former California Governor Ronald Reagan (R) by a 39.5-point landslide. With 65.53% of the popular vote, Nebraska was Reagan's third strongest state after Utah and Idaho.

Results

Results by county

See also
 United States presidential elections in Nebraska
 Presidency of Ronald Reagan

References

Nebraska
1980
1980 Nebraska elections